The Sacred Heart Chaldean Church was a Chaldean Catholic Church located in Chaldean Town, a neighbourhood in Detroit on 7 Mile Road. It was built in 1975 using Assyrian Revival architecture. In 1980, Iraqi President Saddam Hussein donated half a million to the church and was given the key to Detroit. The church’s pastor, Jacob Yasso, calls the former Iraqi president “a very generous, warm man who just let too much power go to his head".  The church was closed in 2015, as the local Assyrian population was very thinned out, and so it moved to a new facility in Warren, Michigan as "Our Lady Of Perpetual Help". The building is being sold, with a "for sale" sign visible from a Google street view from October, 2015.

The old and new churches are part of the Chaldean Catholic Eparchy of Saint Thomas the Apostle of Detroit.

See also

 Chaldean American
 History of the Middle Eastern people in Metro Detroit

References

External links

 Our Lady of Perpetual Help

Chaldean Catholic churches in the United States
Eastern Catholic churches in Michigan
Assyrian-American culture in Michigan
Churches in Detroit
Wooden churches in Michigan